Hugh Latimer was a leader of the English Reformation.

Hugh Latimer may also refer to:

Hugh Latimer (actor) (1913–2006), English actor and toy maker
Hugh Latimer (politician) (1896–1954), Australian politician

See also
Hugh Latimer Dryden (1898–1965), American aeronautical scientist and civil servant